Penaeus semisulcatus, the green tiger prawn or grooved tiger prawn, is a commercially important species of prawn in the genus Penaeus.

Description
Penaeus semisulcatus has a pale brown body which sometimes shows a greenish tint on the carapace with two yellow or cream tansvers bands across the back of the carapace. The abdomen is banded with brownish grey and pale yellow transverse bands, while the antennae are banded brown and yellow. It has a uniformly smooth carapace and abdomen. The rostrum has 7 or 8 dorsal teeth and 3 ventral teeth. The atrodrostral crest and groove, the carina, extends beyond the epigastral tooth with the post-rostral carina almost reaching to the rear of the carapace. The maximum total length is 180mm for males and 228mm for females, weighing up to 130g.

Distribution
Penaeus semisulcatus has an Indo-West Pacific distribution being found from eastern Africa and the Red Sea east to Indonesia and northern Australia. It has also colonised the eastern Mediterranean through the Suez Canal making it a Lessepsian migrant.

Habitat and ecology
Penaeus semisulcatus occurs from coastal waters down to 130m depth over sandy and muddy substrates. In the Persian Gulf P. semisculatus spawning was at its height during December and in March, but there was a secondary peak in autumn and 90% of the female prawns reached sexual maturity after attaining a carapace length of 54mm. Spawning takes place mainly offshore.  The adults are marine but the juveniles prefer estuarine environments.

Human exploitation
Penaeus semisulcatus is of minor to moderate importance in Madagascar, along the eastern coast of Africa and in the Red Sea. Along the south western Asian coasts from the Gulf of Aden to Pakistan this species is of major importance to the offshore fishery. In India it is not as commercially important as Penaeus monodon.  P.semisulcatisis is probably an economically important species in Sri Lanka, Singapore and the Philippines, as well as in Hong Kong, southern Sea of Japan and Korea. In the Mediterranean P. semisulcatus is becoming important to the fisheries in Turkey, Israel and Egypt.

In India Penaeus semisulcatus plays a role in the farming of shrimps and prawns in the ricefields of the Ganges delta. Aquaculture experiments with this species are being conducted in Taiwan and Thailand. Prawns caught in Pakistan are exported frozen or canned, as well as being used to make shrimp meal and shrimp paste.

Australian import ban
In 2017 an outbreak of White spot disease occurred in South East Asia, leading Australia to ban prawn imports.

References

Penaeidae
Edible crustaceans
Commercial crustaceans
Crustaceans described in 1844